Sidalcea malachroides, with the common name mapleleaf checkerbloom, is a flowering plant in the genus Sidalcea.

Distribution
The plant is native to the California Coast Ranges in the North Coast and Monterey Bay regions of California, and the Oregon Coast Range in  Oregon.  It grows below  in elevation.

Within California it is a Vulnerable species listed on the California Native Plant Society Inventory of Rare and Endangered Plants.

Description
The leaves are generally all along stem.

The flowers are head-like spikes, in white or pale purple-white. The bloom period is April to August.

References

External links
Calflora Database: Sidalcea malachroides  (Mapleleaf checkerbloom, Maple leaved checkerbloom)
Jepson Manual eFlora (TJM2) treatment of Sidalcea malachroides
USDA Plants Profile for Sidalcea malachroides (mapleleaf checkerbloom)
UC CalPhotos gallery: Sidalcea malachroides

malachroides
Flora of California
Flora of Oregon
Natural history of the California chaparral and woodlands
Natural history of the California Coast Ranges
Natural history of the San Francisco Bay Area
Flora without expected TNC conservation status